Karl Heinz Friesen (born June 30, 1958) is a Canadian-born German former professional ice hockey goaltender. Friesen spent most of his career in Germany, playing in the Eishockey-Bundesliga and Deutsche Eishockey Liga, but he also played four games in the National Hockey League with the New Jersey Devils during the 1986–87 season. Internationally Friesen represented both West Germany and Germany at multiple tournaments, including the 1984, 1988, and 1992 Winter Olympics, and six World Championships.

Career 
A Canadian of German descent, Friesen played for the West Kildonan North Stars of the Manitoba Junior Hockey League and the St. Boniface Mohawks of the Central Amateur Senior Hockey League, before taking his game to Germany in 1980 and would spend 15 years in Germany's top-flight. In 1985-86, Friesen played for the Maine Mariners of the American Hockey League and had a short stint with the New Jersey Devils of the NHL in 1986-87, but then returned to Rosenheim. He played a total of 12 years with the SB Rosenheim team, two with Hedos Munich and one with the Mad Dogs Munich. Friesen won German championships with Rosenheim in 1982, 1985 and 1989.

A dual citizen of Canada and the Federal Republic of Germany, Friesen represented West Germany internationally on many occasions, including six World Championships, the 1984 and 1988 Winter Olympics and the 1984 Canada Cup. After German Unification, he represented Germany at the 1992 Winter Olympics. He won a total of 105 caps for the German national team.

After retiring in 1996, he returned to his native Canada.

Friesen is a member of the German Ice Hockey Hall of Fame and of the Manitoba Hockey Hall of Fame. In 2000, he was named German goalie of the century.

Career statistics

Regular season and playoffs

International

References

External links

Karl Friesen song (in German)

1958 births
Living people
Canadian ice hockey goaltenders
Canadian people of German descent
Canadian Mennonites
German ice hockey goaltenders
Ice hockey players at the 1984 Winter Olympics
Ice hockey players at the 1988 Winter Olympics
Ice hockey players at the 1992 Winter Olympics
Kildonan North Stars players
Mad Dogs München players
Maine Mariners players
New Jersey Devils players
Olympic ice hockey players of Germany
Olympic ice hockey players of West Germany
Ice hockey people from Winnipeg
Starbulls Rosenheim players
Undrafted National Hockey League players